Allobranchiibius huperziae is a Gram-positive and non-spore-forming species of bacteria from the family of Dermacoccaceae that has been isolated from the roots of the plant Huperzia serrata from Sichuan in China.

References

Micrococcales
Bacteria described in 2017
Monotypic bacteria genera